Dul-e Moniri (also Romanized as Dūl-e Monīrī) is a village in Anaran Rural District, in the Central District of Dehloran County, Ilam Province, Iran. At the 2006 census, its population was 43, in 8 families. The village is populated by Lurs.

References 

Populated places in Dehloran County
Luri settlements in Ilam Province